Franz Doelle (9 November 1883 – 15 March 1965) was a German composer. He worked on around fifty film scores during his career many of them operetta films.

Selected filmography
 When the White Lilacs Bloom Again (1929)
 Mrs. Lehmann's Daughters (1932)
 The Escape to Nice (1932)
 Victor and Victoria (1933)
 A Day Will Come (1934)
 George and Georgette (1934)
 Miss Liselott (1934)
 Just Once a Great Lady (1934)
 Amphitryon (1935)
 The Royal Waltz (1935)
 Donogoo Tonka (1936)
 The Irresistible Man (1937)
 A Man Astray (1940)
 Carl Peters (1941)
 When the White Lilacs Bloom Again (1953)

References

Bibliography
 Hull, David Stewart. Film in the Third Reich: a study of the German cinema, 1933-1945. University of California Press, 1969.

External links

1883 births
1965 deaths
German composers